Nuda libertà (English: Naked freedom) is the fifth studio album by Mexican pop singer Mijares. This album was released in 1990.

History
A rarest album of Mijares, it was recorded totally in Italian, in Rome at the "Easy Records Italiana" studios (Studio Quattro Uno), by Michel ANDINA . The original edition was entitled "Nuda libertà" and after that it was named "Collezione Privata" (Private Collection). This album was a result of his participation in San Remo Festival with the Spanish song "La nevada" (The snowfall) and this same song was performed in Italian by Mia Martini. It includes 7 unpublished songs.

Track listing
Tracks []:
 Nuda
 Io'ci Credo Nelle Stelle
 Al Margini del Sole
 La Mia Chitarra E'donna
 Bella Liberta
 Mal d'Amore
 Piu'sto Giu'e Piu'sto Su
 Cuori Solitari
 La Nevada

1990 albums
Manuel Mijares albums
Italian-language albums